Decobie Durant (born February 9, 1998) is an American football cornerback for the Los Angeles Rams of the National Football League (NFL). He played college football at South Carolina State.

Professional career

Durant was drafted by the Los Angeles Rams with the 142nd pick in the fourth round of the 2022 NFL Draft. Durant recorded his first professional sack and interception in Week 2 against the Atlanta Falcons in the 31-27 win. In the Rams Week 16 game against the Denver Broncos, Durant recorded a pick-six off quarterback Brett Rypien in the 51-14 win. In 2022, Durant led the NFL in interception return yards with 151.

References

External links
 Los Angeles Rams bio
 South Carolina State Bulldogs bio

1998 births
Living people
Players of American football from South Carolina
American football cornerbacks
South Carolina State Bulldogs football players
Los Angeles Rams players